The Pavoloch massacre was a mass killing during the Holocaust on September 5, 1941 in which the Ukrainian shtetl of Pavoloch was depopulated of Jews by the Einsatzgruppen.

Massacre
When World War II began, the Jews of Pavoloch lived in fear of the Nazi death squads, which had killed so many of their brethren in German-occupied countries. They had heard of the terrible things that the Nazis did when they Jews. On September 5, 1941, during Operation Barbarossa, their fears were justified, when an Einsatzgruppen squad drove into the shtetl. The Nazis had orders from SS-Brigadeführer Otto Rasch to exterminate any Jews they found, and the Nazis obeyed the order to the letter. They rounded up all of the 1,500 Jews and took them to the Jewish cemetery, located outside of Pavoloch.

The Nazis forced all of the Jews to dig a mass grave and made them kneel next to the grave. The Nazis shot all 1,500 of them, and the bodies fell into the mass grave. The Einsatzgruppen, seeing that their work was done, quickly filled the pit to exterminate any evidence of the slaughter and drove away.

Memorial
After World War II ended, a memorial was erected in the cemetery to commemorate those that were brutally killed by the Einsatzgruppen. Also, the old synagogue, which survived the short-lived Nazi occupation, is now a museum that houses the records of those who were murdered and contains exhibits on village history.

Sources
 
 
 

1941 in Ukraine
Massacres in Ukraine
Einsatzgruppen
Zhytomyr Oblast
Holocaust locations in Ukraine
Holocaust massacres and pogroms in Ukraine